Saved is a song by American experimental rock band Swans. The track was released as a single for The Burning World (1989) and reached No. 28 on Billboard's Alternative chart.

Track listing

Personnel
Michael Gira – vocals, guitar
Jarboe – backing vocals, keyboards
Norman Westberg – guitar
Bill Laswell – bass

Chart positions

References

1989 singles
Swans (band) songs
1989 songs
Song recordings produced by Bill Laswell